Church of the Exaltation of the Holy Cross is a Catholic church in Vileyka, Belarus. Built between 1906 and 1913, it is now listed as a Belarusian Cultural Heritage object.

History 
A small wooden chapel was built in Vileyka in the 18th century and burned down in 1810. In 1852 a new stone building was built in its place, and at the same time the construction of a new stone church began. In the aftermath of the January Uprising the authorities gave the unfinished building to the Eastern Orthodox church. The Orthodox completed the church and consecrated it in honor of Saint George.

The new permit to construct a brick church was received in 1906. The construction work was finished in 1913, and the new church was consecrated in honor of the Feast of the Cross. It was designed in a combination of Neo-Gothic and Neo-Romanesque styles. The building was damaged during World War I and restored between 1922 and 1928.

Gallery

References

Sources 

Churches in Belarus
Landmarks in Belarus